Horrorscension is the second studio album from Behold... The Arctopus, released in 2012 on Black Market Activities. This is the first album to feature drummer Weasel Walter after the departure of previous drummer Charlie Zeleny in 2009.

Track listing

Personnel
 Colin Marston – bass guitar, recording, mastering, mixing
 Mike Lerner – electric guitar, additional recording (guitar solos 1, 3-6), additional editing
 Weasel Walter – drums, additional recording,

References

2012 albums
Behold... The Arctopus albums
Black Market Activities albums
Albums produced by Colin Marston